In mathematics, the Klein four-group is a group with four elements, in which each element is self-inverse (composing it with itself produces the identity)
and in which composing any two of the three non-identity elements produces the third one.
It can be described as the symmetry group of a non-square rectangle (with the three non-identity elements being horizontal and vertical reflection and 180-degree rotation),
as the group of bitwise exclusive or operations on two-bit binary values,
It was named Vierergruppe (meaning four-group) by Felix Klein in 1884.
It is also called the Klein group, and is often symbolized by the letter V or as K4.

The Klein four-group, with four elements, is the smallest group that is not a cyclic group. There is only one other group of order four, up to isomorphism, the cyclic group of order 4. Both are abelian groups.

Presentations 
The Klein group's Cayley table is given by:

The Klein four-group is also defined by the group presentation

All non-identity elements of the Klein group have order 2, thus any two non-identity elements can serve as generators in the above presentation. The Klein four-group is the smallest non-cyclic group. It is however an abelian group, and isomorphic to the dihedral group of order (cardinality) 4, i.e. D4 (or D2, using the geometric convention); other than the group of order 2, it is the only dihedral group that is abelian.

The Klein four-group is also isomorphic to the direct sum , so that it can be represented as the pairs  under component-wise addition modulo 2 (or equivalently the bit strings under bitwise XOR); with (0,0) being the group's identity element. The Klein four-group is thus an example of an elementary abelian 2-group, which is also called a Boolean group. The Klein four-group is thus also the group generated by the symmetric difference as the binary operation on the subsets of a powerset of a set with two elements, i.e. over a field of sets with four elements, e.g. ; the empty set is the group's identity element in this case.

Another numerical construction of the Klein four-group is the set  with the operation being multiplication modulo 8.

The Klein four-group has a representation as 2×2 real matrices with the operation being matrix multiplication:

On a Rubik's Cube the "4 dots" pattern can be made in three ways, depending on the pair of faces that are left blank; these three positions together with the "identity" or home position form an example of the Klein group.

Geometry 

Geometrically, in two dimensions the Klein four-group is the symmetry group of a rhombus and of rectangles that are not squares, the four elements being the identity, the vertical reflection, the horizontal reflection, and a 180 degree rotation.

In three dimensions there are three different symmetry groups that are algebraically the Klein four-group V:
one with three perpendicular 2-fold rotation axes: D2
one with a 2-fold rotation axis, and a perpendicular plane of reflection: 
one with a 2-fold rotation axis in a plane of reflection (and hence also in a perpendicular plane of reflection): .

Permutation representation 

The three elements of order two in the Klein four-group are interchangeable: the automorphism group of V is the group of permutations of these three elements.

The Klein four-group's permutations of its own elements can be thought of abstractly as its permutation representation on four points:
 V = {, (1,2)(3,4), (1,3)(2,4), (1,4)(2,3) }

In this representation, V is a normal subgroup of the alternating group A4
(and also the symmetric group S4) on four letters. In fact, it is the kernel of a surjective group homomorphism from S4 to S3.

Other representations within S4 are:
 {, (1,2), (3,4), (1,2)(3,4) }
 {, (1,3), (2,4), (1,3)(2,4) }
 {, (1,4), (2,3), (1,4)(2,3) }

They are not normal subgroups of S4.

Algebra 
According to Galois theory, the existence of the Klein four-group (and in particular, the permutation representation of it) explains the existence of the formula for calculating the roots of quartic equations in terms of radicals, as established by Lodovico Ferrari:
the map  corresponds to the resolvent cubic, in terms of Lagrange resolvents.

In the construction of finite rings, eight of the eleven rings with four elements have the Klein four-group as their additive substructure.

The quotient group  is isomorphic to the Klein four-group. In a similar fashion, the group of units of the split-complex number ring, when divided by its identity component, also results in the Klein four-group.

Graph theory 
The simplest simple connected graph that admits the Klein four-group as its automorphism group is the diamond graph shown below.  It is also the automorphism group of some other graphs that are simpler in the sense of having fewer entities.  These include the graph with four vertices and one edge, which remains simple but loses connectivity, and the graph with two vertices connected to each other by two edges, which remains connected but loses simplicity.

Music 
In music composition the four-group is the basic group of permutations in the twelve-tone technique. In that instance the Cayley table is written;

See also
Quaternion group
List of small groups

References

Further reading
 M. A. Armstrong (1988) Groups and Symmetry, Springer Verlag, [ page 53].
 W. E. Barnes (1963) Introduction to Abstract Algebra, D.C. Heath & Co., page 20.

External links
 

Finite groups